The Sydney Twelve were members of the Industrial Workers of the World arrested on 23 September 1916 in Sydney, Australia, and charged with treason under the Crimes Act 1900 (NSW) which incorporated the Treason Felony Act 1848 (Imp). They were John Hamilton, Peter Larkin, Joseph Fagin, William Teen, Donald Grant, Benjamin King, Thomas Glynn, Donald McPherson, Thomas Moore, Charles Reeve, William Beattie, and Bob Besant. The treason charges were dropped prior to trial and replaced with three conspiracy charges: (1) conspiracy to commit arson (2) conspiracy to procure the release of Tom Barker from gaol by unlawful means and (3) conspiracy to excite sedition.

Some within the Australian labour movement claimed the men were framed for their strong anti-war views and their opposition to conscription during the First World War. Former Labor Prime Minister (and later Nationalist) Billy Hughes forced through the Unlawful Associations Act (1916) through Federal Parliament in five days during December 1916, then had the IWW declared an unlawful association.

The case against the Twelve was assisted by the Government hysteria against the IWW. This was typified in the Tottenham murder case involving three members of the IWW and the murder of a policeman at Tottenham, New South Wales, on 26 September 1916. The prosecution made every effort to connect the murder with the charges against the Sydney IWW men. Frank Franz and Roland Nicholas Kennedy were found guilty and executed on 20 December 1916 at Bathurst Gaol, the first executions in New South Wales after a decade. Herbert Kennedy was acquitted.

The case was tried in the Central Criminal Court before Justice Robert Pring and a jury. The jury found Glynn, McPherson, Teen, Beattie, Fagin, Grant and Hamilton guilty of all three charges while Reeve, Larkin, Besant and Moore guilty of the arson and sedition conspiracies and King was guilty of the sedition conspiracy. Justice Pring handed down sentences of fifteen years to Hilton, Beatty, Fagin, Grant, Teen, Glynn and McPherson; ten years to Moore, Besant, Larkin and Reeve; and five years to King. Grant remarked after his sentence was passed: "Fifteen years for fifteen words". The actual words which were quoted in his trial were: "For every day that Tom Barker is in gaol it will cost the capitalist class £10,000." The twelve lodged appeals against their convictions, however these met with limited success - the Court of Criminal Appeal quashed the convictions of Glynn and McPherson for the Barker conspiracy and reduced their sentences to ten years - however the majority of the convictions and sentences were confirmed.

There was an active campaign for the release of the Sydney Twelve and other IWW members held in prison. The Defence and Release Committee was established at the behest of Henry Boote, Editor of the Australian Workers' Union weekly paper, The Worker, and of Ernie Judd, delegate from the Municipal Workers Union on Labor Council of New South Wales. Supporters included Percy Brookfield, the member for Sturt (Broken Hill) in the New South Wales Legislative Assembly, and the poet Lesbia Harford. Unions such as the Ship Painters and Dockers Union were active in the campaign.

The Labor Council of New South Wales commissioned a report into the case in 1918, and an enquiry into the case was also conducted by Justice Philip Street. Both the trade union report and the judicial report found problems with the case, for example the chief witness, Scully, had concocted evidence which he gave at the trial.

After the Storey Labor Government was elected in New South Wales on 20 March 1920, Justice Norman Ewing was appointed to inquire into the trial and sentencing. The judge found that Grant, Beattie, Larkin and Glynn may have been involved in conspiracy of a seditious nature, but recommended that they be released. Six of the men, the judge found, were not "justly or rightly" convicted of sedition: Teen, Hamilton, McPherson, Moore, Besant and Fagin. King was considered rightly convicted of sedition, but recommended for immediate release. Reeve was found to have been rightly convicted of arson. However the judge also rejected any suggestion that the men had been framed. Ten of the men were released in August 1920, and King and Reeve slightly later.

The folksinger Andy Irvine composed a song memorialising the Sydney Twelve, called "Gladiators", released on a record in March 2001.

See also
Australian Sedition Law

References

Further reading

Australian labour movement
Industrial Workers of the World members
1916 in Australia
1916 in labor relations
People convicted of treason against the United Kingdom
Industrial Workers of the World in Australia